Acholonu is a family name that belongs to the ruling dynasty in Orlu, Imo state, Nigeria.

Notable people with this name include:

 Catherine Obianuju Acholonu (1951–2014), Nigerian author, professor and presidential adviser to former president Obasanjo
 D. D. Acholonu (born 1980), Canadian footballer
 Emmanuel Acholonu, former Nigerian naval commander and Military Administrator of Katsina State
 Pats Acholonu (1936–2006), former supreme court justice of Nigeria

See also 

 Ishiobiukwu Gedegwum
 Dynasty
 Non-sovereign African monarchs
 List of Nigerian traditional states

References 

Igbo names